The Cutter House is an historic home at 60 Gilman Road in Yarmouth, Maine, United States. Built in 1730, over a century before today's Yarmouth was incorporated, it is the oldest extant building in the town. It stands almost directly across Gilman Road from the Pioneer Cemetery, which was established a year later. The home, the Pioneer Cemetery and the nearby Ledge Cemetery are all that remain of this early settlement.

Perez B. Loring lived at the Cutter House in the mid-19th century, after it was no longer a manse. For the second half of the 20th century, it was home to Charles and Anita Stickney, who purchased it from Henry Pennell Frank (1872–1948), who is interred in the Ledge Cemetery.

The home is two storeys, with a hip roof. It has five bedrooms and four bathrooms amongst its fourteen total rooms.

See also 

 Historical buildings and structures of Yarmouth, Maine

References 

Residential buildings in Yarmouth, Maine
Clergy houses in the United States
Houses completed in 1730